The 2005 WGC-NEC Invitational was a golf tournament that was contested from August 18–21, 2005 over the South Course at Firestone Country Club in Akron, Ohio. It was the seventh WGC-Bridgestone Invitational tournament, and the second of four World Golf Championships events held in 2005.

World number 1 Tiger Woods won the tournament to claim his ninth World Golf Championships title, which was his fourth Invitational title. He won by one shot over Chris DiMarco, at 6-under-par 274.

Round summaries

First round

Second round

Third round

Final round

Scorecard

Cumulative tournament scores, relative to par

Source:

References

External links
Full results

WGC Invitational
WGC-NEC Invitational
WGC-NEC Invitational
WGC-NEC Invitational
WGC-NEC Invitational